Cyrtospirifer is an extinct genus of brachiopods. The fossils are present in the Middle and Upper Devonian.

Taxonomy 
It is likely that Tenticospirifer, that itself appeared during early Givetian, includes the ancestor of Cyrtospirifer. Cyrtospirifer first occurs in western Europe in the Late Givetian. Tenticospirifer has a relatively narrow hingeline and an inflated and thick shell in common with two of the oldest species known, C. verneuiliformis and C. aperturatus. This group dominated during the late Givetian, but was replaced by other species, such as C. syringothyriformis and C. verneuili which have wide hingelines and thinner shells.

Description 
Cyrtospirifer has a medium to large sized shell, wider than long.

Reassigned species 
 C. glaucus = Regelia glauca

References 

Prehistoric brachiopod genera
Devonian brachiopods
Fossils of Belgium
Middle Devonian first appearances
Famennian extinctions
Spiriferida
Paleozoic life of Alberta
Paleozoic life of the Northwest Territories